Convenience is a 2013 British dark comedy film about two friends who, needing to pay a debt they cannot afford, try to rob a petrol station and end up posing as clerks for the night. The film was written by Simon Fantauzzo and directed by Keri Collins.

Cast
Ray Panthaki as Ajay
Adeel Akhtar as Shaan
Vicky McClure as Levi
Anthony Head as Barry
Jenny Bede as Debbie
James Bradshaw as Clive
Daniel Caltagirone as Tommy
Margaret Jackman as Mavis
Verne Troyer as Dwight
Tom Bell as Stoner 1
Tony Way as Stoner 2

Production
The film was shot in a petrol garage located in Gorseinon, South Wales.

Critical reception
Convenience attracted a positive response from audiences and critics alike. Leslie Felperin, writing for The Guardian, called the film a "fun-fuelled comedy caper" with "good, genuinely funny dialogue". Felperin praised the "likable, tightly synchronised cast". Nev Pierce, for Empire Online called the film "very funny [...] simple, but strong". Louie Freeman-Bassett, for Gorilla Film Online felt Convenience would have been better produced as a fifty-minute play, but singled Adeel Akhtar's performance as the film's best.

References

External links 

Website 

2013 black comedy films
2013 films
2010s English-language films